was a village located in Higashichikuma District, Nagano Prefecture, Japan.

As of 2003, the village had an estimated population of 1,588 and a density of 42.45 persons per km2. The total area was 37.41 km2.

On October 11, 2005, Sakai, along with the villages of Honjō and Sakakita (all from Higashichikuma District), were merged to create the village of Chikuhoku.

Dissolved municipalities of Nagano Prefecture
Chikuhoku, Nagano